Indonesia and Serbia established diplomatic relations in 1954, with the legal frameworks was inherited from the Yugoslavian era. Indonesia has an embassy in Belgrade and Serbia has an embassy in Jakarta. Both nations are the founders of Non Aligned Movement.

History

The bilateral relations was officially established in 1954. The historic political links between Indonesia and Serbia was Non Aligned Movement. Indonesian first President Sukarno and Yugoslavian President Josip Broz Tito was the founding fathers of the Non Aligned Movement back in 1961.

After the dissolution of Yugoslavia, followed by the Bosnian War in 1992–1995, the bilateral relations hit the lowest level, since Indonesia as the world largest Muslim-populated country, condemned the crime of ethnic-cleansing based upon race and religion, against Muslim Bosniaks committed by the Serbs. Naturally, some of Indonesian Muslims shared and demonstrated the solidarity with Muslim Bosniaks.

The bilateral relations returned to normality in 2000s. In 2008, Indonesia supports the national integrity of Serbia by not recognizing the independence of Kosovo from Serbia. Nevertheless, Indonesia has urged Serbia to always follow the peaceful way through dialog to resolving the conflicts and addressing the separatist problems in Kosovo.

Trade
The bilateral trade value in 2004 was US$15 million, and rose to US$50 million in 2008. In 2012, the value of bilateral trade between Indonesia and Serbia amounted to US$40.9 million. The trade balance is heavily in favour to Indonesia, with US$33.9 million Indonesian export to Serbia, while the export from Serbia amounting to US$7 million. Indonesian export to Serbia include textile and agricultural products, while Serbian export to Indonesia include machinery, chemicals, and health appliances.

Cooperations
Indonesia and Serbia has agreed to establish a cooperation in military industry. The cooperation also includes other sectors, such as tourism and culture. To commemorate the 60th anniversary of Indonesia–Serbia bilateral relations, an Indonesian Cultural Night was performed during the 36th International Fair of Tourism in Belgrade, on February 25, 2014. The cultural performance featuring Indonesian traditional dances, exhibition and batik fashion show.

See also
 Yugoslavia and the Non-Aligned Movement

Notes

Literature

External links
Embassy of the Republic of Indonesia in Belgrade, Serbia
Embassy of Serbia in Jakarta, Indonesia

 
Serbia
Bilateral relations of Serbia